Molla Ali or Mulla-Ali may refer to:
Molla Ali, East Azerbaijan
Molla Ali, Qazvin
Molla Ali, Sistan and Baluchestan
Molla Ali, alternate name of Molla Dadi, Sistan and Baluchestan Province